Sting ... Live in Berlin is a live album and concert film by Sting and the Royal Philharmonic Concert Orchestra. It was recorded and filmed on 21 September 2010 at the O2 World in Berlin. The concert features live versions of Sting's songs from The Police as well as his solo song catalogue. The length of the full concert is around 135 minutes, but to get all the songs both the DVD and CD have to be purchased.

Track listing

DVD
All songs written by Sting except where noted.

 "A Thousand Years" (Kipper, Sting)
 "Every Little Thing She Does Is Magic"
 "Englishman in New York"
 "Roxanne"
 "When We Dance"
 "Russians" (Sergei Prokofiev, Sting)
 "I Hung My Head"
 "Why Should I Cry for You"
 "Whenever I Say Your Name"
 "This Cowboy Song"
 "Tomorrow We'll See"
 "Moon Over Bourbon Street"
 "The End of the Game"
 "You Will Be My Ain True Love"
 "All Would Envy"
 "Mad About You"
 "King of Pain"
 "Every Breath You Take"
 "Desert Rose"
 "She's Too Good for Me"
 "Fragile"
 "I Was Brought to My Senses (Intro)"

CD
All songs written by Sting except where noted.

 "If I Ever Lose My Faith in You" – 4:46
 "Englishman in New York" – 4:38
 "Fields of Gold" – 3:35
 "Why Should I Cry For You" – 7:45
 "All Would Envy" – 5:36
 "Tomorrow We'll See" – 4:48
 "The End of the Game" – 6:21
 "Whenever I Say Your Name" – 7:21
 "Shape of My Heart" (Sting, Dominic Miller) – 4:49
 "Moon Over Bourbon Street" – 6:04
 "Mad About You" – 4:45
 "King of Pain" – 5:39
 "Desert Rose" – 4:44
 "Fragile" – 4:50

Personnel
 Sting – vocals, guitar, composer, producer
 Royal Philharmonic Orchestra
 Dominic Miller – guitar
 Ira Coleman – bass
 Jo Lawry – vocals
 Rhani Krija - drums, percussion
 David Cossin - drums, percussion
 Branford Marsalis – saxophone
 Steven Mercurio – conductor, orchestration
 Jorge Calandrelli – orchestration
 David Hartley – orchestration
 Michel Legrand – orchestration
 Vince Mendoza – orchestration
 Rob Mathes – musical director, orchestration, producer
 Scott Hull – mastering
 Elliot Scheiner – mixing

Charts

Certifications

References

Sting (musician) live albums
Live video albums
2010 live albums
2010 video albums
Sting (musician) video albums
Albums produced by Rob Mathes